Thirteen male athletes from Kazakhstan competed at the 1996 Summer Paralympics in Atlanta, United States.

See also
Kazakhstan at the Paralympics
Kazakhstan at the 1996 Summer Olympics

References 

Nations at the 1996 Summer Paralympics
1996
Summer Paralympics